The Kamchatka Current is a cold-water current flowing southwestward from the Bering Strait, along the Siberian Pacific coast and the Kamchatka Peninsula. A portion of this current then becomes the Oyashio Current while the remainder joins the warmer North Pacific Current.

See also 
 
 
 

Currents of the Pacific Ocean